Romain Élie (born 6 March 1985) is a French professional footballer who plays as a defender who plays for Championnat National 2 club Beauvais.

References

External links
 Profile at LevskiSofia.info

1985 births
Living people
Sportspeople from Beauvais
French footballers
First Professional Football League (Bulgaria) players
AS Beauvais Oise players
FC Rouen players
US Raon-l'Étape players
US Boulogne players
FC Gueugnon players
AC Arlésien players
R. Charleroi S.C. players
PFC Levski Sofia players
US Pontet Grand Avignon 84 players
Nîmes Olympique players
Le Puy Foot 43 Auvergne players
French expatriate footballers
Expatriate footballers in Belgium
French expatriate sportspeople in Belgium
Expatriate footballers in Bulgaria
Association football defenders
Championnat National players
Ligue 2 players
Belgian Pro League players
Championnat National 2 players
Championnat National 3 players
Footballers from Hauts-de-France
French expatriate sportspeople in Bulgaria